Michael Grant (born July 26, 1954) is an American author of young adult fiction. He has written over 160 books, though most are as a co-author with his wife, Katherine Applegate. Together they have written the Animorphs and the Everworld series, as well as the Making Out series. Grant is the sole author of the Gone series, the BZRK series, the Messenger of Fear series, and the Front Lines trilogy.

His writing influences include Stephen King, Bill Bryson, Patrick O'Brien, J. R. R. Tolkien, Dan Simmons, and Raymond Chandler

Early life 
Grant was raised in a military family, attending ten schools in five states as well as three schools in France. He became a writer in part because "it was one of the few jobs that wouldn't tie him down to a specific location. He has lived in almost 50 homes in 14 states."

Grant has described growing up poor, in trailer parks, and dropping out of school at age 15. He then got a job at Toys R Us, with a fake ID he obtained by signing up for the draft (during the Vietnam War). After three months, he quit and traveled to Europe for three months.

Personal life 
According to the back flap of one of his books: "He lives in California with his wife, Katherine Applegate, and their two children, and far too many pets." He currently lives in Tiburón, California. His top selling book was Gone.

Bibliography

Animorphs series

Companion books
 Megamorphs 1: The Andalite's Gift (1997)
 Megamorphs 2: In the Time of Dinosaurs (1998)
 Megamorphs 3: Elfangor's Secret (1999)
 Megamorphs 4: Back to Before (2000)
 The Andalite Chronicles (1997)
 The Hork-Bajir Chronicles (1998)
 The Ellimist Chronicles (2000)
 Visser (2000)
 Alternamorphs 1: The First Journey (1999) (ghostwritten)
 Alternamorphs 2: The Next Passage (2000) (ghostwritten)

Everworld series

 Search for Senna (1999)
 Land of Loss (1999)
 Enter the Enchanted (1999)
 Realm of the Reaper (2000)
 Discover the Destroyer (2000)
 Fear the Fantastic (2000)
 Gateway to the Gods (2000)
 Brave the Betrayal (2000)
 Inside the Illusion (2000)
 Understand the Unknown (2000)
 Mystify the Magician (2001)
 Entertain the End (2001)

Remnants series 

 The Mayflower Project (2001)
 Destination Unknown (2001)
 Them (2001)
 Nowhere Land (2002)
 Mutation (2002)
 Breakdown (2002)
 Isolation (2002)
 Mother, May I? (2002)
 No Place Like Home (2002)
 Lost and Found (2003)
 Dream Storm (2003)
 Aftermath (2003)
 Survival (2003)
 Begin Again (2003)

Gone series

Gone: Series One
 Gone (2008)
 Hunger (2009)
 Lies (2010)
 Plague (2011)
 Fear (2012)
 Light (2013)

Monster trilogy: Series Two
Monster (2017)
Villain (2018)
Hero (2019)

The Magnificent 12 series
The Call (2011)
The Trap (2012)
The Key (2013)
The Power (2013)

BZRK series
BZRK (2012)
BZRK II: Reloaded (2013)
BZRK III: Apocalypse (2014)
BZRK: Origins (2013)

Messenger of Fear duology
Messenger of Fear (2014)
The Tattooed Heart (2015)

Short stories 

The Snake: A Messenger of Fear Story (2014: online only)

Front Lines trilogy
Front Lines (2016)
Silver Stars (2017)
Purple Hearts (2018)

A David Mitre Thriller series
A Sudden Death in Cyprus (2018)
An Artful Assassin in Amsterdam (2019)

Stand-alone novels
Eve & Adam with Katherine Applegate (2012)

References

External links
Official UK website

American children's writers
Living people
1954 births
20th-century American novelists
21st-century American novelists
American male novelists
People from Tiburon, California
Novelists from California
Jewish American novelists
American science fiction writers
American young adult novelists
American horror novelists
American alternate history writers
20th-century American male writers
21st-century American male writers
21st-century American Jews